Kae Nemoto is a Japanese theoretical physicist known for her research on photonics, superradiance, quantum energy transport, and linear optical quantum computing. She is a professor at the National Institute of Informatics and at The Graduate University for Advanced Studies, director of the Global Research Center for Quantum Information Science at the National Institute of Informatics, and co-director of the Japanese-French Laboratory for Informatics.   Since 01 April 2022, she leads the Quantum Information Science and Technology Unit at OIST Graduate University, Okinawa, Japan.  

After studying physics at Tokai University, Nemoto did her graduate studies at Ochanomizu University, where she earned a master's degree in 1993 and completed a doctorate in 1995.

In 2015, Nemoto was named as a Fellow of the American Physical Society (APS), after a nomination from the APS Division of Quantum Information, "for pioneering the theory for quantum optical implementations of quantum information processing and communication". She is also a Fellow of the Institute of Physics.

References

Year of birth missing (living people)
Living people
Japanese physicists
Japanese women physicists
Quantum information scientists
Optical physicists
Women in optics
Tokai University alumni
Academic staff of Ochanomizu University
Fellows of the American Physical Society
Fellows of the Institute of Physics